The following television stations broadcast on digital channel 28 in the United States:

 K17HT-D in Hanksville, Utah
 K28AD-D in Montrose, Colorado
 K28CQ-D in Hood River, Oregon, on virtual channel 2, which rebroadcasts KATU
 K28CS-D in Pahrump, Nevada
 K28CW-D in Flagstaff, Arizona, on virtual channel 45, which rebroadcasts KUTP
 K28CY-D in Lewiston, California
 K28DB-D in Fall River Mills, California
 K28DD-D in Bemidji, Minnesota, on virtual channel 42, which rebroadcasts KSAX
 K28DJ-D in Broken Bow, Oklahoma
 K28EA-D in Washington, Utah, on virtual channel 4, which rebroadcasts KTVX
 K28EB-D in Cortez, etc., Colorado
 K28ER-D in Dulce & Lumberton, New Mexico
 K28EU-D in Laughlin, etc., Nevada
 K28FP-D in Astoria, Oregon, on virtual channel 28
 K28FT-D in Milton-Freewater, Oregon
 K28FW-D in Peetz, Colorado, on virtual channel 20, which rebroadcasts KTVD
 K28GC-D in Gothenburg, Nebraska
 K28GD-D in Heppner, etc., Oregon
 K28GE-D in Woodland Park, Colorado
 K28GF-D in Cimarron, New Mexico
 K28GG-D in Medford, Oregon
 K28GI-D in Guymon, Oklahoma
 K28GJ-D in Hatch, New Mexico
 K28GM-D in Rural Garfield County, Utah
 K28GT-D in Crownpoint, New Mexico
 K28GV-D in Tres Piedras, New Mexico
 K28GX-D in Walker Lake, Nevada
 K28GY-D in Santa Barbara, etc., California
 K28HA-D in Grand Valley, Colorado
 K28HI-D in Breckenridge/Dillon, Colorado, on virtual channel 28
 K28HL-D in Riverton, Wyoming
 K28HS-D in Agana, Guam
 K28IF-D in Willmar, Minnesota, on virtual channel 28
 K28IH-D in Rainier, Oregon, on virtual channel 10, which rebroadcasts KOPB-TV
 K28IT-D in Kanab, Utah, on virtual channel 6
 K28IX-D in Pleasant Valley, Colorado, on virtual channel 20, which rebroadcasts KTVD
 K28IZ-D in Ely, Nevada
 K28JC-D in Enterprise, Oregon
 K28JD-D in Fort Madison, Iowa
 K28JH-D in Yuma, Colorado, on virtual channel 20, which rebroadcasts K16NJ-D
 K28JK-D in Huntsville/Liberty, Utah, on virtual channel 13, which rebroadcasts KSTU
 K28JL-D in Morgan, etc., Utah, on virtual channel 13, which rebroadcasts KSTU
 K28JM-D in Waimea, Hawaii
 K28JN-D in Manti, etc., Utah, on virtual channel 2, which rebroadcasts KUTV
 K28JR-D in Wanship, Utah
 K28JS-D in Samak, Utah, on virtual channel 13, which rebroadcasts KSTU
 K28JU-D in Rock Springs, etc., Wyoming
 K28JV-D in Hilo, Hawaii
 K28JX-D in Alva - Cherokee, Oklahoma
 K28JY-D in Carbondale, Colorado
 K28KC-D in Canon City, Colorado
 K28KI-D in Roseburg, Oregon
 K28KJ-D in Chelan, Washington
 K28KM-D in Clareton, Wyoming
 K28KN-D in Emery, Utah
 K28KO-D in Sweetgrass, etc., Montana
 K28KP-D in Clear Creek, Utah
 K28KQ-D in Ferron, Utah
 K28KR-D in Huntington, Utah
 K28KU-D in Crested Butte, Colorado, on virtual channel 28
 K28KV-D in Turkey, Texas
 K28KW-D in Sunnyside, Washington
 K28LE-D in Idaho Falls, Idaho
 K28LG-D in Bridger, etc., Montana
 K28LH-D in Beowawe, Nevada
 K28LK-D in Silver City, New Mexico
 K28LL-D in Redwood Falls, Minnesota, on virtual channel 5, which rebroadcasts KSTC-TV
 K28LM-D in Eureka, Nevada
 K28LO-D in Paisley, Oregon
 K28MH-D in Bend, Oregon
 K28MJ-D in Tillamook, Oregon, on virtual channel 8, which rebroadcasts KGW
 K28MK-D in Phillips County, Montana
 K28MS-D in Bismarck, North Dakota
 K28NM-D in Carlsbad, New Mexico
 K28NN-D in Wailuku, Hawaii
 K28NO-D in Rogue River, Oregon
 K28NT-D in Bentonville & Rogers, Arkansas
 K28NU-D in Buffalo, Oklahoma
 K28NV-D in Ponca City, Oklahoma
 K28NX-D in Montoya & Newkirk, New Mexico
 K28NY-D in La Grande, Oregon
 K28NZ-D in Florence, Oregon
 K28OA-D in Cottonwood, Arizona, on virtual channel 3, which rebroadcasts KTVK
 K28OB-D in Plentywood, Montana
 K28OD-D in Powers, Oregon
 K28OE-D in Watertown, South Dakota
 K28OF-D in Memphis, Texas
 K28OG-D in Kalispell & Lakeside, Montana
 K28OH-D in St. James, Minnesota
 K28OI-D in Jackson, Minnesota
 K28OJ-D in Tropic & Cannonville, Utah
 K28OL-D in Loa, etc., Utah
 K28OM-D in Escalante, Utah
 K28ON-D in Castle Rock, etc., Montana
 K28OO-D in Fountain Green, Utah
 K28OP-D in Boulder, Utah
 K28OQ-D in Fishlake Resort, Utah
 K28OR-D in Caineville, Utah
 K28OS-D in Logan, Utah
 K28OT-D in Coalville, Utah
 K28OU-D in Henefer, etc., Utah
 K28OV-D in Madras, Oregon
 K28OW-D in Parowan/Enoch, etc., Utah
 K28OX-D in Weatherford, Oklahoma
 K28OY-D in Sierra Vista, Arizona
 K28PB-D in McDermitt, Nevada
 K28PD-D in Delta, Oak City, Utah
 K28PE-D in Kanarraville, etc., Utah
 K28PF-D in Vernal, etc., Utah, on virtual channel 30, which rebroadcasts KUCW
 K28PG-D in Price, Utah
 K28PH-D in Duchesne, Utah, on virtual channel 16, which rebroadcasts KUPX-TV
 K28PI-D in Emery, Utah
 K28PJ-D in Elko, Nevada
 K28PK-D in Scofield, Utah
 K28PL-D in Roseau, Minnesota
 K28PN-D in Green River, Utah
 K28PO-D in Lake Havasu City, Arizona
 K28PP-D in Shurz, Nevada
 K28PQ-D in Saint Cloud, Minnesota, on virtual channe1 38
 K28PR-D in Castle Dale, Utah, on virtual channel 16, which rebroadcasts KUPX-TV
 K28PS-D in Ruidoso, New Mexico
 K28PT-D in Manila, etc, Utah
 K28PU-D in Randolph, Utah
 K28PV-D in Clovis, New Mexico
 K28PX-D in Stead, Nevada
 K28PZ-D in Parlin, Colorado, on virtual channel 4, which rebroadcasts K04DH-D
 K28QA-D in Sapinero, Colorado
 K28QC-D in Imlay, Nevada
 K28QE-D in Caballo, New Mexico
 K28QF-D in Sherman, Texas
 K28QJ-D in Duluth, Minnesota
 K28QK-D in Pasco, Washington
 K28QQ-D in Williston, North Dakota
 K28QR-D in La Pine, Oregon
 K28QT-D in Dickinson, North Dakota
 K42KG-D in Fillmore, etc., Utah
 K44GH-D in Alexandria, Minnesota, on virtual channel 44
 KARZ-TV in Little Rock, Arkansas, an ATSC 3.0 station
 KATC in Lafayette, Louisiana
 KAWB in Brainerd, Minnesota, on virtual channel 22
 KAYU-TV in Spokane, Washington
 KBCW in San Francisco, California, on virtual channel 44
 KBTC-TV (DRT) in Seattle, Washington, on virtual channel 28
 KBVU in Eureka, California
 KCET in Los Angeles, California, on virtual channel 28
 KCJO-LD in Saint Joseph, Missouri, on virtual channel 30
 KCMN-LD in Kansas City, Missouri, on virtual channel 42
 KDBK-LD in Bakersfield, California
 KEAM-LD in Amarillo, Texas
 KESQ-TV in Palm Springs, California
 KFDX-TV in Wichita Falls, Texas
 KGRY-LD in Gila River Indian Community, Arizona, an ATSC 3.0 station, on virtual channel 28
 KHNE-TV in Hastings, Nebraska
 KIRO-TV (DRT) in Mt. Vernon, Washington, on virtual channel 7
 KKPM-CD in Yuba City, California, on virtual channel 28
 KLCS in Los Angeles, California, uses KCET's spectrum, on virtual channel 58
 KLEG-CD in Dallas, Texas, on virtual channel 44
 KMMD-CD in Salinas, California
 KMPH-TV in Visalia, California
 KNLD-LD in New Orleans, Louisiana
 KOPB-TV (DRT) in Sentinel Hill, Oregon, on virtual channel 10
 KOZL-TV in Springfield, Missouri
 KPBT-TV in Odessa, Texas
 KSAW-LD in Twin Falls, Idaho
 KSIN-TV in Sioux City, Iowa
 KSPK-LD in Walsenburg, Colorado
 KSTU in Salt Lake City, Utah, on virtual channel 13
 KTBS-TV in Shreveport, Louisiana
 KTFD-TV in Denver, Colorado, on virtual channel 50
 KTPX-TV in Okmulgee, Oklahoma
 KTVA in Anchorage, Alaska
 KUAS-TV in Tucson, Arizona
 KUGB-CD in Houston, Texas, on virtual channel 28
 KVMM-CD in Santa Barbara, California
 KVPX-LD in Las Vegas, Nevada
 KWKD-LD in Wichita, Kansas
 KWKT-TV in Waco, Texas
 KWYB-LD in Bozeman, Montana
 KYUU-LD in Boise, Idaho
 KYVV-TV in Del Rio, Texas
 KZKC-LD in Bakersfield, California, used KDBK-LD's spectrum
 W28CJ-D in Manteo, North Carolina
 W28DA-D in Pittsfield, Massachusetts
 W28DQ-D in Windsor, Vermont
 W28DR-D in Cedarville, West Virginia
 W28DY-D in Sault Ste. Marie, Michigan
 W28EE-D in Canton, etc., North Carolina
 W28EH-D in Adjuntas, Puerto Rico, on virtual channel 2, which rebroadcasts WKAQ-TV
 W28EQ-D in Utuado, Puerto Rico, on virtual channel 2, which rebroadcasts WKAQ-TV
 W28EU-D in Macon, Georgia
 W28EW-D in Toccoa, Georgia
 W28EX-D in Clarksburg, West Virginia
 W28FC-D in Roanoke, West Virginia
 W28FD-D in Greenville, Florida
 W28FG-D in Cleveland-Akron-Canton, Ohio
 WBQC-LD in Cincinnati, Ohio, on virtual channel 25
 WBRE-TV in Waymart, Pennsylvania
 WBWM-LD in Mt Pleasant, Michigan
 WCAU in Philadelphia, Pennsylvania, on virtual channel 10
 WCLJ-TV in Bloomington, Indiana, uses WIPX-TV's spectrum, on virtual channel 42
 WDWW-LD in Atlanta, Georgia, on virtual channel 28
 WEDE-CD in Arlington Heights, Illinois, on virtual channel 34
 WEMT in Greeneville, Tennessee
 WEPT-CD in Newburgh, New York, on virtual channel 15
 WFPT in Frederick, Maryland, on virtual channel 62
 WEVV-TV in Evansville, Indiana
 WFSG in Panama City, Florida
 WGDV-LD in Salisbury, Maryland
 WHFT-TV in Miami, Florida, on virtual channel 45
 WHMC in Conway, South Carolina
 WHPX-TV in New London, Connecticut, on virtual channel 26
 WIFR-LD in Rockford, Illinois
 WIPX-TV in Bloomington, Indiana, on virtual channel 63
 WISN-TV in Milwaukee, Wisconsin, on virtual channel 12
 WJBF in Augusta, Georgia
 WJET-TV in Erie, Pennsylvania
 WJSJ-CD in Tipton, Indiana
 WKAQ-TV in San Juan, Puerto Rico, on virtual channel 2
 WKUW-LD in White House, Tennessee, on virtual channel 40
 WLEX-TV in Lexington, Kentucky
 WLPC-LD in Redford, Michigan, on virtual channel 28
 WMAW-TV in Meridian, Mississippi
 WMCF-TV in Montgomery, Alabama
 WMYS-LD in South Bend, Indiana
 WMYV in Greensboro, North Carolina
 WNYJ-LD in New York, New York, on virtual channel 28
 WOAI-TV in San Antonio, Texas
 WPCB-TV in Greensburg, Pennsylvania, on virtual channel 40
 WRBU in East St. Louis, Illinois, on virtual channel 46
 WRBW in Orlando, Florida, an ATSC 3.0 station, on virtual channel 65
 WREG-TV in Memphis, Tennessee
 WRIC-TV in Petersburg, Virginia
 WSST-LD in Albany, Georgia
 WSYM-TV in Lansing, Michigan
 WSYX in Columbus, Ohio, on virtual channel 6
 WTPM-LD in Mayaguez-Anasco, Puerto Rico, on virtual channel 45
 WTVI (DRT) in Charlotte, North Carolina, on virtual channel 42
 WUDX-LD in Tuscaloosa, Alabama
 WUHF in Rochester, New York
 WUNM-TV in Jacksonville, North Carolina
 WUOA-LD in Birmingham, Alabama
 WVTB in St. Johnsbury, Vermont
 WWBH-LD in Mobile, Alabama
 WWDG-CD in Rome, New York
 WWOO-LD in Westmoreland, New Hampshire
 WWSI in Mount Laurel, New Jersey, uses WCAU's spectrum, on virtual channel 62
 WXOW in La Crosse, Wisconsin
 WYAM-LD in Priceville, Alabama
 WYMI-LD in Summerland Key, Florida
 WYOW in Eagle River, Wisconsin
 WYZZ-TV in Bloomington, Illinois
 WZVN-TV in Naples, Florida

The following television stations, which are no longer licensed, formerly broadcast on digital channel 28:
 K28LA-D in Yreka, California
 K28LC-D in Redding, California
 K28LN-D in Orr, Minnesota
 KILW-LD in Rochester, Minnesota
 KOXI-LD in Camas, Washington
 WCMZ-TV in Flint, Michigan
 WVTX-CD in Bridgeport, Ohio

References

28 digital